Understatement is an aspect of traditional English culture. It has been exploited to humorous effect, but it is also characterised as part of the English cultural attitude to life.

In medieval times 
Old English texts relied extensively upon wordplay such as understatement and double negatives; understatement (litotes) is used at least 94 times in the Anglo-Saxon epic poem Beowulf, a "high frequency". One author has described this "stylistic mannerism" to be inherited from "an earlier, possibly common-Germanic, poetic tradition"; he notes that understatement is also found in mediaeval German poetry and Old Norse poetry. Such understatement may have the effect of mocking irony, humour, emphasis, and the tempering of an (otherwise rather sharp) expression.

Culture 

This attitude of understatement was exemplified by a comment upon Sarah Bernhardt's violent depiction of Cleopatra in the 1891 play of that title: "How different, how very different, from the home life of our own dear Queen!" The Oxford Dictionary of Quotations judges this critique to be apocryphal.

Understatement may be used to convey calmness and self-control to others in a moment of crisis. In 1916 during the opening stages of the Battle of Jutland, Admiral Beatty witnessed the explosion of two of his largest battlecruisers within half an hour of each other; he is said to have remarked to his subordinate that "there seems to be something wrong with our bloody ships today".

Better documented is the cross-cultural miscommunication between British and American military personnel in the midst of the Korean War. In April 1951, 650 British fighting mensoldiers and officers from the 1st Battalion, the Gloucestershire Regimentwere deployed on the most important crossing on the Imjin River to block the traditional invasion route to Seoul. The Chinese had sent an entire division10,000 menagainst the isolated Glosters in a major offensive to take the whole Korean peninsula, and the small force was gradually surrounded and overwhelmed. After two days' fighting, an American, Major General Robert H. Soule, asked the British brigadier, Thomas Brodie: "How are the Glosters doing?" The brigadier, with English understatement, replied: "A bit sticky, things are pretty sticky down there." To American ears, this did not sound desperate, and so he ordered them to stand fast. The surviving Glosters were rescued by a column of tanks; they escaped under fire, sitting on the decks of the tanks.

In November 1963, as The Beatles were becoming a cultural phenomenon in Britain but were still unknown to the Americans, a photo appeared in the British press showing John Lennon, Paul McCartney, and George Harrison playing Rickenbacker guitars. Rickenbacker's London distributor, his "urgency cloaked in British understatement," wrote to the company's California headquarters, "This shows both the Rickenbacker's (sic) used by the group I mentioned to you. We'll need samples of both these models, please."

During the Kuala Lumpur-to-Perth leg of British Airways Flight 9 on 24 June 1982, volcanic ash caused all four engines of the Boeing 747 aircraft to fail. Although pressed for time as the aircraft rapidly lost altitude, Captain Eric Moody still managed to make an announcement to the passengers: "Ladies and Gentlemen, this is your Captain speaking. We have a small problem. All four engines have stopped. We are doing our damnedest to get them going again. I trust you are not in too much distress."

Humour 
The stereotype of English understatement has been exploited in humour, for example in Monty Python's The Meaning of Life. In one scene, a suburban dinner party is invaded by Death, who wears a long black cloak and carries a scythe. "Well," says one party guest, "that's cast rather a gloom over the evening, hasn't it?" In another scene, an Army officer has just lost his leg. When asked how he feels, he looks down at his bloody stump and responds, "Stings a bit."

References 

English culture
Rhetorical techniques